MR-1 is a reserved constituency for minorities in the Khyber Pakhtunkhwa Assembly.

References

Khyber Pakhtunkhwa Assembly constituencies